Jacques Adélaïde-Merlande is a French historian, born on 1 June 1933  in Fort-de-France, Martinique. A former lecturer at the University of the West Indies and Guyana, of which he was president from 1972 to 1977, he is the current president of the Guadeloupe Historical Society.

Biography

Childhood and education 

Jacques Adélaïde-Merlande was born in Fort-de-France and is of Guadeloupean and Martiniquean origin. After completing part of his studies in Martinique, he studied at the Sorbonne, where he became interested in the history of colonisation under the direction of Charles-André Julien and in the history of the labour movement under the direction of Jean Bruhat. In particular, he took a postgraduate diploma on the birth of the Martinique workers' movement under the direction of Charles-André Julien and Jean Bruhat. At the same time, he was active in the Martinique Students' Association.

Academic career 

He was admitted to the agrégation d'histoire in 1962. In 1972, he became the first president of the Centre Universitaire Antilles-Guyane until 1977.

He taught courses in contemporary history, but also in ancient history, particularly in the context of preparation for teaching examinations.

He was an important leader of the Société d'histoire de la Guadeloupe and Martinique and one of the founders of the Association of Caribbean Historians in 1969.

In October 2000, he was awarded an honorary doctorate by the University of the West Indies.

Study 

Jacques Adélaïde-Merlande has worked to popularise the history of Guadeloupe during the revolutionary period and the origins of the West Indian workers' movement. Furthermore, his work as a founder and leader of learned societies also played a key role in the development of Caribbean historical studies.

Publications 

    , No. 26, 1972; reissue Paris: Karthala, 2000, 236 p.
    : Bordas, 1971, 31 p.
    , 1972, 31 p.; reunited with the previous one and reissued under the title , Fort-de-France: Désormeaux, 2001, 63 p.
    , 1895-1910, Pointe-à-Pitre: Cahiers du CERAG No. 31.
    , 1819-1914, by the author, 1979, 323 p.
    , Paris: Karthala, 170 p.
    , Pointe-à-Pitre: Sanoli, 1990, 207 p.
    , 1991, 156 p.
    , 1789-1804, Paris: Karthala, 1992, 222 p.
    , Paris: Karthala, 1993, 303 p.
    , Paris: Éd. caribéennes - L'Harmattan, 1994, 329 p.
    , co-written with Jean Juraver, Gourbeyre : Nestor, 2012 OCLC 844779291.

Main works 

 , vol. 4, Fort-de-France: Société Dajani, 1980, 569 pages.
 , vol. 3, Fort-de-France: Société Dajani, 1981, 569 pages.
 , Pointe-à-Pitre: Éditions Caraïbes, 1986, 6 volumes of 306 pages
 , Pointe-à-Pitre: Éditions Caraïbes, 1993, 4 volumes.

References 

1933 births
People from Fort-de-France
20th-century French historians
21st-century French historians
University of the West Indies academics
Living people